Ahmida Zenasni (born 10 July 1993) is an Algerian footballer who plays as a defender for ASO Chlef in the Algerian Ligue Professionnelle 1.

References

External links

1993 births
Living people
People from Ghazaouet
Association football midfielders
Algerian footballers
Algerian Ligue Professionnelle 1 players
Algerian Ligue 2 players
WA Tlemcen players
USM Bel Abbès players
CR Belouizdad players
JS Saoura players
JSM Béjaïa players
21st-century Algerian people